Chirixalus cherrapunjiae, with the common names Cherrapunji bubble-nest frog or Cherrapunji bush frog, is a species of frog in the family Rhacophoridae. It is endemic to north-eastern India.

Taxonomy and systematics
This species was originally placed in genus Philautus and later moved to Chirixalus because it was described as having free-living tadpoles. For a time, Chirixalus was recognized as synonymous with Chiromantis but is now recognized as a separate genus.

Distribution and habitat
It is endemic to Meghalaya and Arunachal Pradesh states of north-eastern India. There is little information on habitat and ecological requirements of this species.

References 

Frogs of India
Endemic fauna of India
Environment of Arunachal Pradesh
Environment of Meghalaya
Taxonomy articles created by Polbot
Amphibians described in 1966